Sander Rue (born February 6, 1954) is an American politician who served as a member of the New Mexico Senate from January 2009 to January 2021.

Education
Rue earned a Bachelor of Business Administration from the University of New Mexico.

Elections
In 2020, Rue was defeated by Democratic nominee Harold Pope Jr.
2012: Rue was unopposed for both the June 5, 2012 Republican Primary, winning with 1,894 votes and the November 6, 2012 General election with 14,327 votes.
2002: When House District 23 incumbent Republican Representative Robert Burpo ran for Governor of New Mexico, Rue ran in the three-way 2002 Republican Primary but lost to Eric Youngbird (their totals are reversed), who went on to win the November 5, 2002 General election against Democratic nominee Jim Southard.
2008: When Senate District 23 Independent Senator Joseph Carraro retired and left the seat open, Rue ran in the June 8, 2008 Republican Primary, winning with 2,218 votes (53.7%) and was unopposed for the November 4, 2008 General election, winning with 22,238 votes.

References

External links
Official page at the New Mexico Legislature

Sander Rue at Ballotpedia
Sander Rue at OpenSecrets

Place of birth missing (living people)
1948 births
Living people
Republican Party New Mexico state senators
Politicians from Albuquerque, New Mexico
University of New Mexico alumni
21st-century American politicians